The International Film Festival Rotterdam (IFFR) is an annual film festival held at the end of January in various locations in Rotterdam, the Netherlands.  Since its foundation in 1972, it has maintained a focus on independent and experimental filmmaking by showcasing emerging talents and established auteurs. The festival also places a focus on presenting cutting edge media art and arthouse film, with most of the participants in the short film program identified as artists or experimental filmmakers. IFFR also hosts CineMart and BoostNL, for film producers to seek funding. The IFFR logo is a stylized image of a tiger that is loosely based on Leo, the lion in the MGM logo.

History 
The first festival — then called Film International — was organized in June 1972 under the leadership of Huub Bals. The festival profiled itself as a promoter of alternative, innovative and non-commercial films, with an emphasis on the Far East and developing countries. Around 1983, the festival founded CineMart to serve as a "regular film market," and later modified the business model to serve instead as a "co-production market", which helps a selected number of film producers connect with possible co-producers and funders for their film projects.

After the festival founder's sudden death in 1988, a fund was initiated and named after him (Hubert Bals Fund), used for supporting filmmakers from developing countries.

The non-competitive character of the festival changed in 1995, when the VPRO Tiger Awards were introduced—three yearly prizes for young filmmakers making their first or second film. The next year, Simon Field, formerly Cinema Director at the London Institute of Contemporary Arts, became director of the festival. In 2004 Sandra den Hamer took over as director of the festival, and from 2007 to 2015 the director was Rutger Wolfson. Film producer Bero Beyer was the next director and in 2020, Vanja Kaludjercic was appointed as the new director.

Festival screening locations 

The IFFR screens films at multiple locations, including the Pathé cinema at Schouwburgplein, De Doelen, Cinerama, WORM, Oude Luxor Theater, Theater Rotterdam Schouwburg, KINO and LantarenVenster.

Tiger Award winners 
The Tiger Award has had various sponsors over the years. In the years leading up to and including 2010 it was sponsored by the VPRO. In 2011 the award was presented by the Prins Bernhard Cultuurfonds and since 2012 by Hivos.

See also
 75B, Netherlands design studio
 Rotterdam Film Festival 2002 Main Short Program

References

External links 

 International Film Festival Rotterdam (official website)
 New Arrivals
 Hubert Bals Fund
 youtube channel
 
 Indebioscoop  "Epiloog IFFR 2014"(in Dutch)

Experimental film festivals
Film festivals in the Netherlands
Culture in Rotterdam
Tourist attractions in Rotterdam
Film markets
Film festivals established in 1972